Henry Ssenyondo (born 12 August 1993) is a Ugandan cricketer. He played in the 2014 ICC World Cricket League Division Three tournament. In April 2018, he was named in Uganda's squad for the 2018 ICC World Cricket League Division Four tournament in Malaysia.

In July 2018, he was part of Uganda's squad in the Eastern sub region group for the 2018–19 ICC World Twenty20 Africa Qualifier tournament. In October 2018, he was named in Uganda's squad for the 2018 ICC World Cricket League Division Three tournament in Oman.

In May 2019, he was named in Uganda's squad for the Regional Finals of the 2018–19 ICC T20 World Cup Africa Qualifier tournament in Uganda. He made his Twenty20 International (T20I) debut for Uganda against Botswana on 20 May 2019. In July 2019, he was one of twenty-five players named in the Ugandan training squad, ahead of the Cricket World Cup Challenge League fixtures in Hong Kong. In November 2019, he was named in Uganda's squad for the Cricket World Cup Challenge League B tournament in Oman.

In November 2021, he was named in Uganda's squad for the Regional Final of the 2021 ICC Men's T20 World Cup Africa Qualifier tournament in Rwanda. In May 2022, he was named in Uganda's side for the 2022 Uganda Cricket World Cup Challenge League B tournament.

References

External links
 

1993 births
Living people
Ugandan cricketers
Uganda Twenty20 International cricketers
Place of birth missing (living people)